Queen Wonchang or Queen Gyeongheon, was the grandmother of Wang Geon, founder of the Goryeo dynasty which she later Posthumously honoured as a queen alongside her husband in 919.

Family
Father: Tou En Dian Jiao Gan (두은점각간, 頭恩坫角干)
Husband: Uijo of Goryeo (고려 의조)
Son: Wang Ryung (왕륭); married Lady Han, Queen Wisuk (위숙왕후)
Son: Wang Pyeong-dal (왕평달)
Unnamed son
Unnamed son

See also 
 Founding legends of the Goryeo royal family

References

Royal consorts of the Goryeo Dynasty
9th-century Korean women